Sergey Mironchik (born 7 August 1975) is a retired Belarusian football midfielder.

Honours
BATE Borisov
Belarusian Premier League champion: 2002

References

External links

Profile at BATE website

1975 births
Living people
Belarusian footballers
Association football midfielders
FC Fandok Bobruisk players
FC Osipovichi players
FC Dnepr Rogachev players
FC Khimik Svetlogorsk players
FC BATE Borisov players
FC Naftan Novopolotsk players
FC Belshina Bobruisk players
People from Babruysk
Sportspeople from Mogilev Region